Susan Smith (born 1 June 1965) is a British rower. She competed at the 1988 Summer Olympics and the 1992 Summer Olympics.

References

External links
 

1965 births
Living people
British female rowers
Olympic rowers of Great Britain
Rowers at the 1988 Summer Olympics
Rowers at the 1992 Summer Olympics
Sportspeople from Norwich